Pyrola asarifolia, commonly known as liverleaf wintergreen, bog wintergreen or pink wintergreen, is a plant species of the genus Pyrola native to western North America. It is found primarily on forest margins at mid latitude in the Pacific Northwest and northern California.  It is so named simply because its leaves maintain their green color through winter.

Description

Cultivation
Its dust-like seeds are hard to germinate.

References

External links

Jepson Manual Treatment - Pyrola asarifolia

asarifolia
Flora of the Northwestern United States
Flora of the Western United States
Flora of the Northern United States
Flora of Canada
Flora of California
Flora of the Sierra Nevada (United States)
Garden plants of North America
Flora without expected TNC conservation status